In ice hockey, the goaltender (commonly referred to as the goalie) is the player responsible for preventing the hockey puck from entering their team's net, thus preventing the opposing team from scoring. The goaltender mostly plays in or near the area in front of the net called the goal crease (often referred to simply as  the crease). Goaltenders tend to stay at or beyond the top of the crease to cut down on the angle of shots. In the modern age of goaltending there are two common styles, butterfly and hybrid (hybrid is a mix of the traditional stand-up style and butterfly technique). Because of the power of shots, the goaltender wears special equipment to protect the body from direct impact. 

Goaltenders are one of the most important players on the ice, as their performance may greatly impact the outcome or score of the game. One-on-one situations, such as breakaways and shootouts, have the tendency to showcase a goaltender's pure skill, or lack thereof. No more than one goaltender per team is permitted to be on the ice at any given time. The rules do not oblige the use of a goaltender and so teams may instead opt to play with an extra skater. However the defensive disadvantage that follows means that this strategy is normally used purely as a desperation maneuver when needing to score late in a game. It may also be used when there is a delayed penalty (should the team to be short-handed touch the puck the play will stop as the penalty is called).

The goaltender is also known as the goalie, goaler, goalkeeper, net minder, tendy, and tender by those involved in the hockey community. In the early days of the sport, the term was spelled with a hyphen as goal-tender. The art of playing the position is called goaltending and there are coaches, usually called the goalie coach who specialize exclusively in working with goaltenders. The variation goalie is typically used for items associated with the position, such as goalie stick and goalie pads.

Goaltenders in ice hockey

Roster
Goaltenders are a specialized position in ice hockey; at higher levels in the game, no goaltenders play other positions and no other players play goaltender. At minor levels and recreational games, goaltenders do occasionally switch with others players who have been taught goaltending; however, most recreational hockey rules are now forbidding position swapping due to an increase in injuries.

A typical ice hockey team has two or three goaltenders on its roster. Most teams typically have a starting goaltender who plays the majority of the regular season games and all of the playoffs, with the backup goaltender only stepping in if the starter is pulled or injured, or in cases where the schedule is too heavy for one goaltender to play every game.

The NHL requires each team have a list of "emergency" goaltenders. The list provides goaltender options for both the home and visiting teams. These goaltenders are to be called to a game if a team does not have two goaltenders to start the game. An "emergency" goaltender may also be called if both roster goaltenders are injured in the same game.

Goalie tandem
Some teams have used a goaltender tandem where two goaltenders split the regular season playing duties, though often one of them is considered the number one goaltender who gets the start in the playoffs. An example is the 1982–83 New York Islanders with Billy Smith and Roland Melanson; Melanson was named to the NHL second All-Star team for his regular season play while Smith won the Conn Smythe Trophy as the playoff MVP and both players shared the William M. Jennings Trophy for fewest goals allowed. Another instance is the Edmonton Oilers' Andy Moog and Grant Fuhr; both of them earned All-Star Game appearances for the regular season play, with Moog being the starter in the 1983 playoffs and Fuhr for the 1984 playoffs (although Moog started Game 4 and 5 of the 1984 Stanley Cup Finals due to Fuhr's injury) and subsequent postseasons.

The Toronto Maple Leafs had Terry Sawchuk and Johnny Bower share goaltending duties in the regular season and games, playoffs, winning the 1964–65 Vezina Trophy (shared) and the 1967 Stanley Cup.  The 1996–97 Philadelphia Flyers' Ron Hextall and Garth Snow alternated in the playoffs; Snow started nine of the ten games during the first two rounds, but Hextall took over in game two of Conference Finals and remained the starting goaltender for the remainder of the playoffs, though Snow started for game two of the Stanley Cup Finals.

Privileges

The goaltender has special privileges and training that other players do not. They wear special goaltending equipment that is different from that worn by other players and is subject to specific regulations. Goaltenders may use any part of their bodies to block shots. The goaltender may legally hold (or freeze) the puck with their hands to cause a stoppage of play. If a player from the other team hits the goaltender without making an attempt to get out of their way, the offending player may be penalized. In some leagues (including the NHL), if a goaltender's stick breaks, they can continue playing with a broken stick until the play is stopped, unlike other players who must drop any broken sticks immediately.

The goaltender normally plays in or near the goal crease the entire game, an area marked in front of the net, unlike the other positions where players are on ice for shifts and make line changes. Attackers cannot make contact with the goaltender within the crease, interfering with their ability to make saves. Attackers may still however enter the crease if they have the opportunity to make a play on a loose puck.

Additionally, if a goaltender acts in such a way that would cause a normal player to be given a penalty, such as slashing or tripping another player, the goaltender cannot be sent to the penalty box. Instead, one of the goaltender's teammates who was on the ice at the time of the infraction is sent to the penalty box in their place. However, the goaltender does receive the penalty minutes on the scoresheet. However, if the goaltender receives a Game Misconduct or Match penalty, they must immediately leave the ice and be replaced by another goaltender - in such cases, an unpenalized player is required to serve any minutes assessed to the ejected player in the penalty box regardless of the ejected player's position.

Goaltenders are often pulled if they have allowed several goals in a short period of time, whether they were at fault for the surrendered goals or not, and usually a substituted goaltender does not return for the rest of the game. In 1995, Patrick Roy was famously kept in net by the head coach as "humiliation" despite allowing nine goals on 26 shots.

Thirteen goaltenders have scored a total of sixteen goals in National Hockey League (NHL) games. A goalkeeper can score by either shooting the puck into the net, or being awarded the goal as the last player on their team to touch the puck when an opponent scored an own goal. A goal scored by shooting the puck is particularly challenging as the goaltender has to aim for a six-foot-wide net that is close to 180 feet away, while avoiding opposing defencemen; in the case of own goals, the combined circumstance of the own goal itself in addition to the goaltender being the last player to touch the puck makes it a very rare occurrence. Of the fifteen goals, eight were scored by shooting the puck and seven were the result of own goals.

A team is not required to use a goaltender. At any time in a game, a team may remove its goaltender from the ice in favor of an extra attacker. Using an extra attacker is usually intended to overwhelm the opposing team's defense, and unlike during a power play, the defense cannot legally ice the puck, (if they are not already shorthanded due to a penalty. If the team on defense is serving a penalty, then the usual icing rules prevail.) putting the team without a goaltender at a significant advantage on offense. The vulnerability that comes with leaving the net untended means that, if the opposing team does manage to advance the puck out of their own defensive zone, a far easier empty net goal can be scored.

NHL rules strongly encourage that teams use goaltenders in overtime; if a team opts for the extra attacker in overtime and an empty-net goal is scored, the game is credited as a regulation loss instead of an overtime loss. (An overtime loss earns one standings point, as opposed to two for a win of any sort and none for a regulation loss or overtime loss incurred under an empty net.) Teams thus typically forgo using a goaltender only in situations where they are trailing by one or two goals with only a short time (typically less than four minutes) left in the game and have possession of the puck in their opponent's defensive zone. Prior to the introduction of the shootout, NHL teams occasionally pulled goalies in overtime during rare late season situations where the team pulling its goaltender needed two points to remain in playoff contention. The shootout has essentially ended this practice since teams are statically much more likely to win a shootout as opposed to winning with an empty net in overtime, but even with the introduction of the shootout to resolve games tied after overtime it is still theoretically possible for a situation to arise where it may be advisable for an NHL team to pull a goaltender late in the regular season when tied late in regulation time or in overtime since the statistics "regulation wins" followed by "regulation and overtime wins" are the top two criteria to break ties in the standings, but as of  such a scenario has not occurred since the adoption of the shootout.

The rules of the IIHF, NHL and Hockey Canada do not permit goaltenders to be designated as on-ice captains, because of the logistical challenge of having the goaltender relay rules discussions between referees and coaches and then return to the crease. (The Vancouver Canucks named goaltender Roberto Luongo as their captain during the 2008–09 and 2009–10 seasons, but due to NHL rules, he did not serve as the official on-ice captain.) In the NCAA, there is no position-based restriction on the team captain.

Out of the five positions on the rink, goaltenders are frequently candidates for the Conn Smythe Trophy as playoff MVP, as they have won this honor in four of the last ten playoffs. Patrick Roy has won a record three times, and four goaltenders have won the Conn Smythe as part of the losing team in the Finals.

Saves

When a goaltender either blocks or stops a shot from going into their goal net, that action is called a save. Goaltenders often use a particular style, but in general they make saves any way they can: catching the puck with their glove hand, deflecting the shot with their stick, blocking it with their leg pads or blocker or another part of their body, or collapsing to butterfly position to block any low shot coming, especially in close proximity. After making a save, the goaltender attempts to control the rebound to avoid a goal scored by an opposing player when the goaltender is out of position ('scoring on a rebound'), or to allow the goaltender's own team to get control of the puck. Goaltenders may catch or hold a puck shot at the net to better control how it re-enters play. If there is immediate pressure from the opposing team, a goaltender may choose to hold on to the puck (for a second or more, with judgment from the referee) to stop play for a face-off. If a goaltender holds on to the puck for too long without any pressure they may be subject to a 2-minute delay of game penalty. Recently, in the NHL and AHL, goaltenders have been restricted as to where they can play the puck behind the net.

Goaltender equipment, techniques and skills have evolved over the years, dramatically improving their effectiveness altering the dynamics of the game.  Goaltenders have added masks, longer pads and are physically bigger.  Ken Dryden has called for bigger nets to counter their effectiveness.

Glossary and techniques
 Angle play: The method where, by positioning oneself in a direct line between the puck (not the shooter) and the net, a goaltender covers more of the net than he would otherwise be able to, and often "skulling" slowly, directly towards and closing on the opposing shooter to block more of the net. Two of the most notable angle goaltenders in the 1970s were Gilles Gilbert and Bernie Parent.
Blocker: The blocker is a rectangular piece of equipment with a glove to hold the stick. The blocker is predominantly worn on the dominant hand of the goaltender. The blocker protects the wrist area and can be used to direct shots away from the net. The blocker should be positioned at one's side, and at a height which allows the goaltender's stick to remain flat on the ice while in their ready stance.
Trapper: This goalie's catching glove was originally shaped in the same fashion as a baseball glove. It has evolved into a highly specific piece of equipment that is designed specifically for catching the puck. Some of the more significant changes are the use of a "string mesh" in the pocket of the trapper and the substantial palm and wrist protection. The pocket is the area between the thumb and first finger of the glove and is where most goaltenders try to catch the puck; catching in the pocket reduces the chance of a rebound falling out of the glove. The trapper must not be more than 18 inches across. The trapper can be held in a variety of positions depending upon the individual goaltender, but the trend among younger goaltenders is to hold the glove with the palm facing towards the shooter, instead of the "shake hands" position that was popular previously. The "Cheater" portion of the glove is the portion of the glove on the outside area of the thumb and the part that covers the wrist of the goaltender.
 Butterfly save: On low shots, modern goaltenders usually work in the "butterfly" position, keeping their knees together and their stick covering their five-hole, or knee gap. A fairly new, more effective way of stopping low shots is to redirect the puck with the stick. The goalie does this by rotating their hips, their glove and stick square with the puck as they direct it to the corner to the left or right of them, depending on which side the puck is shot to, rather than kicking the puck way out of reach. The glove is kept up and out, ready for a possible deflection, and the goaltender is focused on the incoming shot. Goaltenders should keep both arms out in front of them at all times, covering the gaps between the goaltender's arms and body (sometimes called the 7 and 11 holes), and making it easier to direct rebounds with the stick and blocker.
 Butterfly slide: On breakaways or any other movement goaltenders should be using this technique to make "proper saves". To perform this goaltender move, you must use your leg to push off with your skate and with one knee hovering just above the ice while using your other skate to push your body side to side.
 Hasek roll: The Hasek roll is a desperation maneuver named after Czech goaltender Dominik Hasek. In the stacked pad stance the lower part of the net is protected very well, but the upper third is completely open. In a last-ditch effort to block an incoming high shot the goaltender can roll around his upper back, flailing his pads through the air and stacking them on the other side. If the timing is right the goalie might get his leg up just in time to make the save.

 Holes one through five: When a goaltender stands in the net in the ready position, there are seven open areas that the goalie must cover. They are:
 Glove side, high: this area is defined by the goaltender's arm and catcher on the bottom, mask on the inside, and the post and top of the goal on the outside.
 Glove side, low: this area is defined by the goaltender's arm and catcher on the top, the ice on the bottom, and the outside post of the goal. During a butterfly-style save, this area is closed off completely and the catcher is typically stacked on top of the leg pad as the leg is extended to cover the post.
 Stick side, high: this area is defined by the goal post, top of the goal, and the goalie's arm and blocker. The top half of the goaltender's stick is held in this area, but is not commonly used for stopping the puck.
 Stick side, low: this area is the lower half of the stick side, defined by the blocker and arm, the ice, and the outer post of the goal. During a butterfly save this area is also covered by the leg pad with the blocker stacked on top to protect against low shots. When a goaltender is standing, the paddle of their stick is used to cover this area and to deflect the puck away from the net.
 'Five Hole': the fifth and final area is between the goalie's leg pads and skates. This area is protected by the blade of the stick at all times, and is closed up by the upper leg pads when the goalie is in the butterfly position.
 'Six and Seven Hole': the six and seven holes are relatively new terms to identify the areas under either armpit of the goalie. Goaltenders who hold their trapper high or blocker further out to the side of their body are said to have six and seven holes. 
 'Six Hole (slang)': The "six hole" is also used as a slang term used when a save is made, but the puck goes into the net, resulting in a goal. The term is used when the goalie is unsure how the puck made it past them.

 Leg pads: Worn on the goaltender's legs to both protect the legs and help stop shots. The leg pads generally come to about three inches above the knee. Pads that are too long will affect balance and timing; pads that are too short will not protect the knees or allow the goaltender to make butterfly saves properly.
 (Leg) kick save: A save made with any part of the leg pads. The goaltender should remain relaxed and skate backwards with the incoming shot, thus helping to absorb the blow and reduce the rebound effect. One type of leg pad save is the butterfly save.
 Lie: The angle created between the handle (paddle) of a goaltender's stick and the blade. The higher the lie, the closer the stick resembles the capital letter "L". A higher lie number of 15+ is traditionally for goaltenders who tend to stand up more in their stance; A lower lie number of 11 or 12 is for goaltenders who play with a more butterfly stance down on the ice more often.
Mask: The protective headgear worn by goaltenders. The first goaltender to wear a mask in the National Hockey League was Clint Benedict in 1930 who wore a crude form made of leather. In November 1959, Jacques Plante, wore a self-made fiberglass mask after taking a New York Rangers shot to the face. Following his lead, goaltenders around the world began to don protective headgear, which is now a requirement. Masks have evolved from the flush style introduced by Plante, to the player's helmet/special "birdcage" style best associated with Vladislav Tretiak and Chris Osgood, to the modern hybrid helmet, made of advanced materials such as carbon fiber or Kevlar, increasing in safety as time went on. Especially at higher levels of hockey, many goaltenders have their masks painted to represent their team's colors/imagery, landmarks in the city they play in or personal interests/nicknames. Examples of this include Mike Richter's Statue of Liberty mask, Ed Belfour's Eagle on his mask (Eddie the Eagle nickname), Ryan Miller featuring the words "Matt Man" on his masks in honor of his late cousin, and Craig Anderson honouring his father's National Corvette Museum board service (as a former Corvette racer) by having a Chevrolet Corvette on his masks.
 Paddle: The thick part of the goaltender's stick, not to be confused with the blade. The blade is the part of the stick that should remain flat on the ice, as compared with the paddle.
 Paddle down: A type of stance by the goaltender when the play is coming from the corner to the front of the net and the puck carrier is carrying the puck in front of the net looking to score. Here the goaltender puts the stick down on the ground, parallel to the ice, with the leg farthest from the post down and the other up and ready to push. This works well against angled rushes or wrap arounds where the skater would normally out–skate the goalie. The skater does have the top part of the net to shoot at, but it is difficult to lift the puck over the goalie from up close. The paddle down stance is also effective against low passes from behind the net to players looking to score from the slot.
 Poke check: When the goaltender wants to poke the puck away from an opposing player, they quickly slides their hand up the stick, thrusting forward towards the puck. An improperly played poke check is a risky play; the goaltender may miss, and the puck-carrier will be left with an unguarded net. In tight situations, a quick, hard jab could be used.
 Pro-fly: This style of play is derived from the butterfly style of play, although most will argue that this is nothing more than a marketing term. Current leg pad design allows for the full face of the pad to be perpendicular to the ice, maximizing blocking area. This is also called "flaring the pad", almost all modern goaltenders play this style. The stance is very wide and low to maximize the amount of body blocking the net. Many of today's great goaltenders have adopted this technique. This forces the shooter to get the puck off the ice to score. The con of this stance is that it is very hard to move quickly. The more efficient users of this style include Henrik Lundqvist of the New York Rangers, Jonathan Quick of the Los Angeles Kings, and Roberto Luongo of the Florida Panthers. This is still considered a butterfly motion, as the mechanics of making the save are the same, however it is the design of the leg pad that achieves this rotation more than anything.
 Screen shot: Screen shots are blind shots, in which the goalie can not find the location of the puck. Goalies should never anticipate or guess when and where the puck will hit. In the screen shot, another player (usually an opponent, but sometimes the goaltender's own teammate) stands between the shooter and the goaltender, obscuring the goaltender's vision of the shot. On a screen shot, the goaltender must do everything possible to try to see the shot, as dropping to the butterfly stance and thrusting their glove out at the sound of a shot is not the best idea in the modern game. Some goalies, such as Ed Belfour or Ron Hextall, went as far as (illegally) punching players in the head or slashing their legs.
 Shuffle: A technique for lateral movement when the puck is relatively close to the net. The goaltender slides their legs, one at a time, in the desired direction. If the goaltender is not quick this technique momentarily leaves the five-hole open. This is the most common method of movement for a goaltender when in the butterfly position.
 Skate save: A save made with the goaltender's skate. The goaltender decides which direction the rebound should travel in, and turns their skate in that direction. Then, bending the other leg, they push towards the puck with the off leg, as the bent knee drops to the ice. This move is rarely used since the butterfly method has become popular. A skate save's effectiveness is more limited because of the difficulty in directing a puck compared with using a stick, a blocker, or the pad.
 Skating: A common fallacy is that the goaltender can get by with merely adequate skating, and often young players are placed in net because of their poor skating. In fact, the goaltender must be one of the best technical skaters on the team, and must be able to keep up with the moves of every skater on opposing teams. In particular, goaltenders must be adept at lateral skating and quick pivoting. Goaltenders must also have exceptional leg strength and the capability for very explosive movement.
 Stacked Pad Slide: When a goaltender is on the angle, often a sudden pass close to the net will leave the net relatively unguarded. Stacking the pads is a desperation move in which the goaltender slides feet-first, with legs together (and consequently, "stacked"), across the crease, attempting to cover as much space as possible.
 Stance: In a proper stance, the goaltender has the weight on the balls of their feet, the trapper and blocker just above knee-height and slightly out in front so they can be seen in the goalies peripheral vision, and the stick flat on the ice. Stance should also be conformed to the goaltender's style and comfort.
 Stick: The stick, held by the goaltender in their blocker hand, the blade of the stick should remain flat on the ice. Keep notice of the lie on a new stick. A high lie will force a goaltender to play on their heels, offsetting balance, while a low lie places a goaltender lower to the ice, and may affect high saves.
 Stick save: A save made with the goaltender's stick. On stick saves, the goaltender should not keep a tight grip on the stick, instead allowing the shot's momentum to push the stick back into the skates/pads, cushioning the blow.
 Stood on his head: This is a term to describe an outstanding performance by an ice hockey goaltender in a short period of time. Often when a goalie lets out a rebound, the opposition returns the shot quickly, and the goalie has to make a quick save. A goalie often falls on their side and "stacks the pads" and appears to nearly stand on their head. The term may have been derived after NHL President Frank Calder, alluding to the 1918 rules change that permitted goalies to leave their feet to make a save, remarked, "As far as I am concerned, they can stand on their head(s)."
 'T-push:' A technique used by goaltenders to move in a lateral direction. To perform a C-step, a goaltender directs their outside skate at the desired angle, pushing with the opposite leg, covering the five hole. This method of lateral movement is most effective when the puck is far from the net. Use of this move when the puck is in close is not needed. Shuffling is good when the puck is in close.
 Skulling: Skulling is a method of moving inward and outward from the goal crease, often used in "angle play". Most often used in setting up prior to the puck entering their zone, especially to "cut down the angle", this move is accomplished by simply allowing your skates to separate, resulting in forward motion, then pulling your skates back together and stopping. At no time during a skull do your skates leave the ice. This can also be referred to as telescoping or bubbling.

Common variations/nicknames in ice hockey
Goaltenders are called by several different names such as: tender, tendy, goalie, sieve, netminder, keeps, keeper.

Playing styles

Stand-up style
The oldest playing style is the stand-up style. In this style, goaltenders are to stop the puck from a standing position, not going down. The goaltenders may bend over to stop the puck with their upper body or may kick the puck. Such saves made by kicking are known as kick saves or skate saves. They may also simply use their stick to stop it, known as a stick save. This was the style seen in the early NHL and was most commonly used up until the early 60s. One of the more notable goaltenders who was last seen using stand up was Bill Ranford, but most of the goaltenders from earlier decades such as Jacques Plante were considered pure stand up goaltenders.

As the name suggests, the stand-up style refers to a style of goaltending in which the goaltender makes the majority of the saves standing up. This style is not as popular in the modern era, with the majority of contemporary goaltenders switching to the butterfly style and the hybrid style. The stand-up style is in contrast to the butterfly style, where goaltenders protect the net against incoming shots by dropping to their knees and shifting their legs out.

The advantage of the stand-up style is in the continued mobility of the goaltender mid save. While standing, a stand-up goaltender can remain square to the puck and adjust his positioning to ensure that he is covering as much of the net as possible at all times. The goaltender is also in a better position to stop pucks that are headed towards the upper part of the net.

The main disadvantage of the stand-up style, however, is a susceptibility to shots travelling along the bottom half of the net. A larger percentage of shots occur in the bottom portion of the net, and a goaltender utilizing the butterfly will cover a larger portion of that area. If there is a screen, however, a stand-up goaltender is generally in a better position to see the slapshot.

Butterfly style

Another style is the "Butterfly", where goaltenders go down on both pads with their toes pointing outwards and the tops of their pads meeting in the middle, thus closing up the five hole. This results in a "wall" of padding without any holes, lowering the chances of low angle shots getting in. These goaltenders rely on timing and position. Early innovators of this style were goaltending greats Glenn Hall and Tony Esposito who played during the 50s-60s and 70s-80s, respectively. Hall is credited to be among the first to use this style, and both he and Esposito had tremendous success with it. The most successful goaltender to adopt this style was Patrick Roy, who has 550 career wins in the NHL. This is the most widely used style in the NHL today. "Butterfly" goaltenders have developed methods of sliding in the "Butterfly" position in order to move around fast in one-timer situations. As pad size increased, it became a more notable style of goaltending and is still evolving.

Hybrid style
This style of goaltending is a combination of both stand-up and butterfly style, where the goaltender primarily relies on reaction, save selection, and positioning to make saves. Hybrid goaltenders will usually control rebounds well, deflect low shots with their sticks, will utilize the butterfly, and are generally not as predictable as goaltenders who rely heavily on the butterfly as a save selection. Most players are not pure stand-up or butterfly, but simply tend to prefer stand-up or butterfly over the other. If a player does not have any preferences, he is considered a hybrid goaltender. All modern NHL goaltenders generally use some form of this style. Some goaltenders who do this effectively are Ryan Miller, Jaroslav Halak, Jimmy Howard, Tuukka Rask, Carey Price and formerly Evgeni Nabokov and Martin Brodeur.

Empty net situations

Normally, the goaltender plays in or near the goal crease the entire game. However, teams may legally pull the goalie by substituting in a normal skater and taking the goaltender off the ice. A team temporarily playing with no goaltender is said to be playing with an empty net. This gives the team an extra attacker, but at significant risk—if the opposing team gains control of the puck, they may easily score a goal. However, shooters that attempt to score on an empty net from the opposite side of the red line face getting called for icing the puck if they miss the net. There are two common situations where a goaltender is generally pulled, as well as two less common situations:

1. The opposing team has a delayed penalty coming against them
The offended team, if in control of the puck, will pull their goaltender for an extra man. This is safe since as soon as a player on the team to be penalized touches the puck, the whistle is called, so they cannot score on the empty net. This effectively increases the one-man disadvantage beyond the standard penalty time. It is possible, however, for a team to accidentally score on their own empty net.
2. A team needs a goal in order to avoid losing (such as trailing in the remaining minute or two of a game)
The 6 on 5 play advantage is very risky, as it is fairly certain that if the opposing team gets control of the puck they will be able to score on the empty net. Sometimes if a team is trailing in the last minutes of regulation, and has a power play advantage, they may pull the goaltender for a 6 on 4 or even 6 on 3 advantage.
3. In the last few seconds of a period with a faceoff in the attacking zone
Because the defending team would likely not have enough time to start an attack even if they win the faceoff, the attacking team may pull the goalie to have a short man advantage.
4. In a tournament that takes goal differential into account, a team may pull the goalie with a significant amount of time left in an effort to create a more advantageous goal differential.
If the team could be eliminated even if they win but could still advance with a loss based on goal differential, the team may decide it has nothing to lose by trying to score with a man advantage, similar to the second situation.
A goal scored in an empty net situation is not recorded as a shot faced or goal against on the personal stats of the goaltender who has left the ice.

Back-up goaltender
In professional ice hockey, the back-up goaltender fills an important team role. Although the back-up will spend most games sitting on the bench, the back-up must be prepared to play every game. A back-up may be forced into duty at any time to relieve the starting goaltender in the event of an injury or poor game performance. The back-up will also be called upon to start some games to give the starter the opportunity to rest from game-play during the season.

Most professional leagues require each home team to maintain a list of local non-professional goaltenders, available to either team, who can be used in the exceptional case that one or both of a team's normal goaltenders are injured or unavailable (such as a player acquired in a trade or minor league call-up arriving late on short notice); such a goaltender who fulfills that role is known as an emergency back–up goaltender (or EBUG). Similar rules are in place for the NHL's minor leagues, where emergency goaltenders are used much more frequently. Those on a team's emergency list are given free attendance to home games they are assigned and may also help out as a practice goalie. Emergency goalies are often called from nearby college teams, adult semi-pro/amateur leagues, or the home team's own coaching/facilities staff. If activated for a game, most emergency goaltenders only dress to sit on the bench, as a team's normal back-up takes over; only five emergency goalies (David Ayres, Scott Foster, Jorge Alves, Thomas Hodges, and Matt Berlin) have ever seen recorded playing time in an NHL game. Emergency goalies who are activated sign either an amateur or professional tryout contract.

During the Stanley Cup playoffs, roster limits are relaxed and teams routinely recall minor league players (known as "black aces") to act as depth, resulting in playoff EBUGs being minor league professionals rather than local amateurs.

NHL goaltender awards
 The Vezina Trophy is awarded each year by the NHL to the league's most outstanding goaltender as voted on by the general managers of the league's 32 teams, from 1981–82 NHL season and onwards.
 The William M. Jennings Trophy is awarded each year by the NHL to the goaltender(s) from the team that allowed the fewest goals during the regular season, from 1981–82 NHL season and onwards.
 The Roger Crozier Saving Grace Award was awarded from 1999–2000 to the 2006–07 seasons by the NHL to the goaltender with the best save percentage during the regular season.
 The Hart Memorial Trophy is awarded to the Most Valuable Player in the NHL.
 The Calder Memorial Trophy is awarded to the Rookie of the Year.
 The Ted Lindsay Award is awarded to the most outstanding player in the regular season as judged by the members of the NHL Players Association.

Goaltenders credited with goals

A goaltender scoring a goal in an NHL game is a very rare feat, having occurred only fifteen times in the history of the NHL, the first time occurring in 1979 after the league had been in existence for six decades. NHL rules forbid goaltenders from participating in play past the center line, so a goal by a goaltender is possible only under unusual circumstances.

Eight of those fifteen goals resulted from the goaltender shooting into an empty net. The remaining seven goals were not actually shot into the net by the goaltender; rather the goaltender was awarded the goal because he was the last player on his team to touch the puck before the opposition scored on themselves. Martin Brodeur is the only NHL goaltender to be credited with three career goals (two in the regular season and one in the playoffs), Ron Hextall is the only goaltender who has scored two goals by shooting the puck into an empty net (once in the regular season and once in the playoffs). Damian Rhodes and Jose Theodore are the only goaltenders in NHL history to score a goal in which they also had a shutout game. Evgeni Nabokov of the San Jose Sharks was the first goaltender to score a power play goal. If a goaltender crosses the center line and shoots the puck from that location or any other location past the center line, the goal does not count.

NHL

AHL
A chronological list of goals scored in the AHL by goaltenders:

 Darcy Wakaluk, December 5, 1987, Rochester Americans at Utica
 Paul Cohen, March 28, 1992, Springfield Indians vs. Rochester
 Robb Stauber, October 9, 1995, Rochester Americans at Prince Edward Island
 Christian Bronsard, October 30, 1999, Syracuse Crunch at Rochester
 Jean-Francois Labbe, February 5, 2000, Hartford Wolf Pack at Quebec
 Chris Mason, October 15, 2001, Milwaukee Admirals at Utah
 Antero Niittymaki, April 11, 2004, Philadelphia Phantoms at Hershey
 Seamus Kotyk, April 17, 2005, Milwaukee Admirals at San Antonio
 Drew MacIntyre, February 20, 2008, Manitoba Moose at Chicago (overtime winner)
 Chris Holt, March 19, 2010, Binghamton Senators vs. Rochester
 Reto Berra, January 16, 2015, Lake Erie Monsters at Chicago Wolves
 Alex Nedeljkovic, March 10, 2018, Charlotte Checkers vs. Hartford
 Tristan Jarry, November 14, 2018, Wilkes-Barre/Scranton Penguins at Springfield
 Maxime Lagace, May 25, 2019, Chicago Wolves at San Diego (first ever goalie goal in Calder Cup Playoffs history)
 Collin Delia, December 17, 2021, Rockford IceHogs at Texas
 Lukas Dostal, March 2, 2022, San Diego Gulls vs. Colorado
 Joel Hofer, May 12, 2022, Springfield Thunderbirds vs. Wilkes-Barre/Scranton
 Jesper Wallstedt, November 12, 2022, Iowa Wild vs. Chicago
 Pyotr Kochetkov, March 3, 2023, Chicago Wolves vs. Manitoba

ECHL
A chronological list of goals scored in the ECHL by goaltenders:

 Corwin Saurdiff, March 18, 1995, Hampton Roads Admirals versus Charlotte Checkers
 Olie Sundstrom, December 15, 1995, Erie Panthers versus Wheeling Nailers
 Sean Gauthier, December 19, 1995 at Raleigh IceCaps
 Nick Vitucci, March 6, 1996, Charlotte Checkers versus Louisville RiverFrogs (Vitucci is the only goalie to be credited with a goal on a guarded net)
 Mark Bernard, March 22, 2001, Toledo Storm versus Johnstown Chiefs
 Mike Smith, October 26, 2002, Lexington Men O'War versus Dayton Bombers
 Brian Eklund, December 5, 2003, Pensacola Ice Pilots at Mississippi Sea Wolves
 Trevor Koenig, March 2, 2005, Atlantic City Boardwalk Bullies at Wheeling Nailers
 Jonathan Quick, October 24, 2007, Reading Royals at Pensacola Ice Pilots
 Timo Pielmeier, December 19, 2009, Bakersfield Condors at Utah Grizzlies
 Brian Foster, February 15, 2013, Trenton Titans at Cincinnati Cyclones (Trenton own goal on empty net, Foster last Cyclone to touch puck)
 Alex Nedeljkovic, December 30, 2016, Florida Everblades Vs. Atlanta Gladiators

IHL
 Ryan Mior, Flint Generals versus Dayton Gems
 Fred Brathwaite, November 9, 1996,  Manitoba Moose, at Long Beach Ice Dogs

KHL
 Ilya Proskuryakov, January 25, 2009, Metallurg Magnitogorsk at Ak Bars Kazan
 Edgars Masalskis, January 7, 2010, Dinamo Riga at Amur Khabarovsk

CHL
The first recorded instance of a professional goaltender scoring a goal occurred on February 21, 1971, in the CHL. In a game between the Oklahoma City Blazers and the Kansas City Blues, the Oklahoma City Blazers were trailing 2-1 and decided to pull their goaltender. Michel Plasse, the goaltender for the Kansas City Blues then scored on an open net.

Subsequently, four goaltenders have scored empty-net goals in the CHL: Phil Groeneveld of the Fort Worth Fire scored against the Thunder in Wichita, Kansas, on November 20, 1995; Bryan McMullen scored for the Austin Ice Bats on February 17, 2002; and Mike Wall of the Arizona Sundogs scored a goal against Corpus Christi on March 16, 2007. Danny Battochio is the most recent vs the Tulsa Oilers on December 31, 2011.

NCAA
 Having been the last player to touch the puck for his team, Jim Tortorella was credited with a goal while playing for the University of Maine in 1980.
 Having been the last player to touch the puck for his team, Damian Rhodes was credited with a goal while playing for Michigan Technological University on January 21, 1989.
 Having been the last player to touch the puck for his team, Andy Allen was credited with a goal while playing for the University of Vermont in 1998.
 Chad Alban scored an empty-net goal for Michigan State University against Ferris State on February 28, 1998. Alban is the first goalie in NCAA history to shoot the puck himself and score a goal.
 Mike Mantua scored an empty-net goal for Western Michigan University in 2002.
 Having been the last player to touch the puck for his team, Jonathan Quick was credited with a goal for the University of Massachusetts in 2007.
 Having been the last player to touch the puck for his team, Kyle Richter was credited with a goal for Harvard University in 2008.
 Having been the last player to touch the puck for her team, Shanley Peters was credited with a goal while playing for the University of Wisconsin - Superior women's team, in a game on November 15, 2013 against the University of Wisconsin - Eau Claire.
 Mitch Gillam scored an empty-net goal in his NCAA debut for Cornell University against Niagara University on November 26, 2013.
 Evan Weninger scored an empty-net goal for University of Nebraska-Omaha against Miami University on January 13, 2018.
Atte Tolvanen scored an empty-net goal for Northern Michigan University against Michigan Tech University on December 7, 2018.
 Corinne Schroeder was credited with an empty-net goal in her first start with the Quinnipiac University Bobcats on September 25, 2021.

SM-liiga
 Mika Järvinen, 3 December 2008, KalPa against Lukko Rauma

Swedish Hockey League
 Vesa Toskala, 1999–2000, Färjestad BK
 Jarmo Myllys, 1999–2000 & 2000–2001, Luleå HF
 Jörgen Wikström, 1999–2000 IF Björklöven (First Eltiserien Goalie to score OG)
 Karol Križan 2005–2006 Modo Hockey
 Andreas Andersson, 2007–2008, HV71

2.GBun
 Mike Bales, 30 September 2005, Straubing Tigers at Landshut

Italy
 Craig Kowalski, December 3, 2009, Hockey Club Valpellice vs Sportivi Ghiaccio Pontebba

AL-Bank Ligaen (Denmark)
 Brian Greer, January 6, 2004 (SønderjyskE against Aalborg)
 Frederik Andersen, March 13, 2010, Frederikshavn White Hawks at Rødovre Mighty Bulls

Norway
 Chris-Henrik Nygård, September 30, 2011 (Stjernen II vs Grüner)

Erste Bank Eishockey Liga (Austria)
 Andrew Verner, January 27, 2006 (Klagenfurter AC vs HC TWK Innsbruck)
 Jaakko Suomalainen, December 30, 2010 (HK Acroni Jesenice vs KHL Medveščak Zagreb)
 Thomas Höneckl, December 21, 2012 (EC VSV vs HC TWK Innsbruck "Die Haie")

Australian Ice Hockey League (AIHL)
 August 18, 2014: Melbourne Ice goaltender Jaden Pine-Murphy was credited with a shorthanded empty-net goal during a playoff game against the Newcastle North Stars.

Junior hockey
 January 7, 1987, Chris Clifford of the Kingston Canadians scored an empty-net goal against Toronto, becoming the first OHL goalie to score a goal
 While playing for the Medicine Hat Tigers, Chris Osgood scored an empty-net goal; as well, Olaf Kolzig scored a goal while with the Tri-City Americans
 April 20, 1993, Fred Brathwaite scored a goal while with the Detroit Jr. Red Wings
 February 21, 1997, the Muskoka Bears' Ryan Venturelli became the first Metro Junior Hockey League goalie to score two goals (both empty net) in a hockey game. The goals came in an 11–6 win against the Durham Huskies
 March 30, 2004, Justin Peters, then with the Toronto St. Michael's Majors, scored an empty-net goal during the playoffs against the Sudbury Wolves
 September 25, 2005, Antoine Lafleur of the P.E.I. Rocket was credited with an empty-net powerplay goal against the Halifax Mooseheads
 December 17, 2006, John Faulkner of the Sarnia Blast (currently in the UNO Mavericks) scored a shorthanded, empty-net goal, becoming the only junior B goalie to score a shorthanded goal.
 December 6, 2008, in two separate games, two different QMJHL goalies scored goals; Peter Delmas (Lewiston MAINEiacs) was credited with a goal against the Quebec Remparts and Maxim Gougeon (Rimouski Océanic) scored an empty-netter against the Cape Breton Screaming Eagles.
 June 2009, during a junior B playoff game, Brantford Golden Eagles goaltender Daryl Borden scored an empty-netter.
 April 23, 2012, Mark Visentin of the Niagara IceDogs scored an empty-net shorthanded goal during the playoffs against the Ottawa 67's.
 November 12, 2012, Gabriel Grunwald (Wisconsin Badgers Alumni) of the OJHL Georgetown Raiders became the first goalie in history to score an empty-net shorthanded goal, while also posting a shutout in the exact same game. This game was played against the Mississauga Chargers.
 April 8, 2013, George Sørensen of Denmark's national under-18 hockey team scored an empty-net shorthanded goal against France's national under-18 hockey team.
 During the 2014–15 QMJHL season, François Brassard became the first goaltender in league history to score two goals in one season. He scored his first on December 13, 2014, as a member of the Cape Breton Screaming Eagles, and he scored his second on February 28, 2015, as a member of the Gatineau Olympiques.
 October 9, 2015, Tyler Parsons of the London Knights was credited with an empty-net shorthanded goal against the Sudbury Wolves, which eventually stood as the game winner in a game London won 6–2.
 October 19, 2015, Sean Leahy of the WSHL's Salt Lake City Moose scored an empty net goal.
 March 18, 2016, Stuart Skinner of the Lethbridge Hurricanes scored an empty net goal.
 January 7, 2017, Etienne Montpetit of the Val-d'Or Foreurs scored a shorthanded empty net goal.
 January 14, 2017, Mathieu Bellemare of the Gatineau Olympiques was credited with a goal with the opposing goaltender in the net.
 February 18, 2017, Eric Stewardson of the PJHL's Blenheim Blades scored an empty net goal during the playoffs against the Lakeshore Canadiens.
 April 13, 2017, Dylan Wells of the Peterborough Petes scored an empty net goal during the playoffs against the Kingston Frontenacs.
 November 18, 2017, Mikhail Berdin of the USHL's Sioux Falls Stampede scored an empty net goal.
 December 19, 2017, Dawson Rodin of the WSHL's Utah Outliers scored an empty net goal.
 January 2, 2018, Nolan Hakr of the PJHL's Mooretown Flags scored an empty net goal against the Wallaceburg Lakers.
 January 18, 2018, Tristan Bérubé of the Gatineau Olympiques scored an empty net goal.
 February 15, 2019, Anthony Hurtubise of the GOJHL's St. Thomas Stars scored a double-overtime game-winning goal into an empty net against the Komoka Kings.
 March 10, 2020, Lukas Parik of the Spokane Chiefs scored an empty net goal, as well as shut out the Kamloops Blazers.
 December 17, 2021, Antoine Coulombe of the Shawinigan Cataractes scored an empty net goal.

See also

 Breakaway (ice hockey)
 Centre
 Defenceman
 Forward
 Rover (ice hockey)
 Winger
 List of NHL players
 D-zone coverage

Notes

References
Bibliography
 
Notes

External links
 The Goalies Archive Complete goaltending history of every NHL and WHA teams
 HockeyGoalies.org Comprehensive list of goalies
 The Goalie Crease Network A worldwide goaltending community

Goalkeeping
Ice hockey goaltenders
Ice hockey terminology
Ice hockey positions